Gordon Elliott may refer to:

 Gordon Elliott (journalist) (born 1956), British Australian journalist and producer, radio and television personality
 Gordon Elliott (racehorse trainer) (born 1978), Irish racehorse trainer